Chartered Alternative Investment Analyst (CAIA) (pronounced "KAI-ah") is a professional designation offered by the CAIA Association to investment professionals who complete a course of study and pass two examinations.  The "alternative investments" industry is characterized as dealing with asset classes and investments other than standard equity or fixed income products.  Alternative investments can include hedge funds, private equity, real assets, commodities, and structured products.  The CAIA curriculum is designed to provide finance professionals with a broad base of knowledge in alternative investments.

The Chartered Alternative Investment Analyst Association was founded in 2002 by the Alternative Investment Management Association (AIMA) and the Center for International Securities and Derivatives Markets (CISDM).  The CAIA Association is an independent, not-for-profit, global organization committed to education and professionalism in the field of alternative investments. CAIA designees are required to maintain membership in the CAIA Association and adhere to professional and ethical standards. As of 2021, there are over 12,000 CAIA members.

The Journal of Alternative Investments is the official publication of the CAIA Association.  The JAI is one of nine journals published by Institutional Investor Journals.

Curriculum 
The CAIA program is divided into two levels. The Level I curriculum focuses on the fundamentals of alternative investment markets, while Level II concentrates on advanced topics in alternative investments.  Both levels take a global perspective and incorporate issues of ethics and professional conduct. Candidates can take exams from anywhere in the World.

Level I
The CAIA Level I exam consists of 200 multiple-choice questions. The Level I curriculum covers six topics, listed below. CAIA Level I candidates are assumed to have an elementary undergraduate understanding of the basic concepts of traditional finance and quantitative analysis.

The Level I curriculum covers:
 Professional Standards and Ethics
Standard 1: Professionalism
Standard 2: Integrity of Capital Markets
Standard 3: Duties to Clients
Standard 4: Duties to Employers
Standard 5: Investment Analysis, Recommendations, and Actions
Standard 6: Conflicts of Interest
Standard 7: Responsibilities as a CFA (CAIA) Institute Member or CFA (CAIA) Candidate
 Introduction to Alternative Investments
What is an Alternative Investment?
The Environment of Alternative Investments
Quantitative Foundations
Statistical Foundations
Measures of Risk and Performance
Foundations of Financial Economics
Benchmarking and Performance Attribution
Alpha, Beta, and Hypothesis Testing
Regression, Multivariate, and Nonlinear Methods
 Real Assets
Natural Resources and Land
Commodity Forward Pricing
Commodities: Application and Evidence
Operationally Intensive Real Assets
Liquid and Fixed-Income Real Estate
Real Estate Equity investments
 Hedge Funds
Structure of the Hedge Fund Industry
Macro and Managed Futures Funds
Event-Driven Hedge Funds
Relative Value Hedge Funds
Equity Hedge Funds
Funds of Hedge Funds
 Private Equity
Introduction to Private Equity
Equity Types of Private Equity
Debt Types of Private Equity
 Structured Products
Introduction to Structuring
Credit Risk and Credit Derivatives
CDO Structuring of Credit Risk
Equity-Linked Structured Products

The CAIA Association recommends that candidates devote 200 or more hours of study to prepare for the Level I exam.

Level II
The CAIA Level II exam consists of 100 multiple-choice questions, plus three sets of constructed-response (essay) questions.  The Level II curriculum is broadly divided into two sections: alternative investments and Core and Integrated Topics. Candidates must apply the skills and knowledge from Level I to gain a deeper understanding of issues involved in each of the areas of alternative investments. The Core and Integrated Topics text is updated annually to reflect the latest industry and research developments.

The Level II curriculum covers:

 Topic 1 - Emerging Topics
 Topic 2 - Ethics, Regulation and ESG
 Topic 3 - Models
 Topic 4 - Institutional Asset Owners and Investment Policies
 Topic 5 - Risk and Risk Management
 Topic 6 - Methods for Alternative Investing
 Topic 7 - Accessing Alternative Investments
 Topic 8 - Due Diligence and Selecting Strategies
 Topic 9 - Volatility and Complex Strategies

The CAIA Association recommends that candidates devote 200 or more hours of study to prepare for the Level II exam.

Historical pass rates
Grading begins once the examination window is closed, and Level I results are posted within three weeks after the final examination day. Level II exam results are available within six weeks after the last exam day, due to the need to grade essay questions.

The percentage of candidates that pass the CAIA exams changes from exam to exam.  As of Fall 2020, less than 34% of candidates are able to pass both CAIA Level I and Level II exams on consecutive first attempts.

Candidates may augment their study of the CAIA curriculum materials with third-party preparation programs. Those programs are offered by: UpperMark, Kaplan Schweser, Top Finance, Kaplan Finance with Schweser—Hong Kong, Kaplan Finance, with Schweser—London, Hong Kong Securities and Investment Institute (HKSI), IEB (Instituto de Estudios Bursatiles), and NYSSA.

Chapters 
Once the program and eligibility requirements have been met, CAIA Members are able to join Chapters. There are thirty CAIA Chapters around the world, including Atlanta, Boston, Chicago, Singapore, London, and Los Angeles. Chapter activities include educational panels with expert speakers and deliver on CAIA's mission to educate Candidates and Members about relevant issues in alternatives.

See also
 The Chartered Financial Analyst designation of the CFA Institute
 Certified International Investment Analyst
 The Financial Risk Manager (FRM) international professional certification offered by the Global Association of Risk Professionals
 The Certified Management Accountant certification offered by Institute of Management Accountants.
 The Professional Risk Manager (PRM) certification offered by the PRMIA
 The Certificate in Investment Performance Measurement designation of the CFA Institute
 The Chartered Insurance Professional designation of the Insurance Institute of Canada

References

External links
 CAIA Association Official Website
 AIMA Official Website
 CISDM Official Website

Investment
Professional certification in finance